The Jewish Future Alliance (JFA) is a New York–based volunteer group founded by Rabbi Yaacov Behrman. The group advocates on behalf of the Jewish community and other minorities.

Political Advocacy

The JFA serves as a liaison between elected leaders and the constituents they serve to discuss improving the community.

The JFA educates United Nations personnel from countries with small Jewish populations about Jewish religion and culture. The program also offers tours of the New York Jewish community to dignitaries.

References

Jewish organizations based in New York City
Organizations based in New York City
Jews and Judaism in New York City